The 2015–16 Georgia bulldogs basketball team represented the University of Georgia during the 2015–16 NCAA Division I men's basketball season. The team's head coach was Mark Fox, who was in his seventh season at UGA. They played their home games at Stegeman Coliseum and were members of the Southeastern Conference. They finished the season 20–14, 10–8 in SEC play to finish in a tie for sixth place. They defeated Mississippi State and South Carolina to advance to the semifinals of the SEC tournament where they lost to Kentucky. They were invited to the National Invitation Tournament where they defeated Belmont in the first round to advance to the second round where they lost to Saint Mary's.

Previous season
The 2014–15 Bulldogs advanced to the semifinals of the SEC Tournament whey they lost to Arkansas.  They received an at-large bid to the NCAA Tournament where they lost to Michigan State in the Second Round.

Departures

Recruits class of 2015

Recruits class of 2016

Roster

Schedule and results

|-
!colspan=9 style="background:#000000; color:white;"| Exhibition

|-
!colspan=9 style="background:#000000; color:white;"| Regular season

|-
!colspan=9 style="background:#000000; color:white;"| SEC Tournament

|-
!colspan=9 style="background:#000000; color:white;"| NIT

See also
2015–16 Georgia Lady Bulldogs basketball team

References

Georgia Bulldogs basketball seasons
Georgia
Georgia
Georgia Bulldogs
Georgia Bulldogs